Luis Ángel Mendoza Escamilla (born 3 February 1990), also known as El Quick, is a Mexican professional footballer who plays as a winger.

Club career
Mendoza made his debut with Tigres UANL on February 18, 2010, against Santos Laguna, coming on as a substitute. He played in five more games, starting once and afterwards he was sent to Ascenso MX club La Piedad. For the Apertura 2012, Mendoza signed with San Luis.

Club América
Mendoza's consistency and good performances earned the attention of América, whom he eventually signed for prior to the Apertura 2013 tournament. Mendoza made his debut on July 31, 2013, against León, and eventually became an undisputed starter in the club's starting-eleven. His best performance of the tournament came on August 24 against Morelia, where he scored a brace and had an assist in América's 3–1 victory in the Estadio Azteca. On December 14, 2014, Mendoza received a red card for mocking his opponents in the Liga MX final against Tigres UANL in which his team won 3–0.

International career
In October 2013, Mendoza received his first call up to the senior national team (managed by former Club América coach Miguel Herrera) for a friendly against Finland and the two-legged 2014 FIFA World Cup playoff against New Zealand, although he did not play in any of the three matches.

Honours
América
Liga MX: Apertura 2014
CONCACAF Champions League: 2014–15

Santos Laguna
Liga MX: Clausura 2015
Campeón de Campeones: 2015

Cruz Azul
Campeón de Campeones: 2021

FAS
Salvadoran Primera División: Apertura 2022

References

External links
 
 
 
 Luis Mendoza at Soccer Wiki
 

1990 births
Living people
Footballers from Nuevo León
Association football defenders
Club América footballers
Tigres UANL footballers
San Luis F.C. players
La Piedad footballers
Santos Laguna footballers
Chiapas F.C. footballers
Club Tijuana footballers
Deportivo Toluca F.C. players
Atlético Morelia players
Liga MX players
Sportspeople from Monterrey
Mexican footballers